Borș is either a liquid ingredient used in Romanian and Moldovan cuisine or the sour soup (ciorbă) typically made with this ingredient. 

The ingredient borș consists of water in which wheat or barley bran, sometimes sugar beet or a slice of bread have fermented. After decanting, the result is a slightly yellowish, sour liquid which can also be drunk as such. It contains lactic acid plus vitamins and minerals extracted from the bran. Whole lovage leaves can be added in the final liquid.

Borș can also mean a sour soup (ciorbă) where the sour ingredient is typically borș.

The word borș shares its etymology with the Ukrainian borshch or borscht, but it has a different meaning: the traditional Ukrainian borshch is a beetroot soup, which Romanians generally call borș de sfeclă roșie (red beetroot borscht)". In fact, Romanian gastronomy may use with hardly any discrimination the Romanian word ciorbă ("soup"), borș or, sometimes, zeamă ("juice") or acritură ("sour stuff"). In Moldavia region (nowadays, Western Moldavia, Moldova, and Bukovina), where Romanians lived in closest contact with Ukrainians, the word borș means simply any sour soup.

Romanian "borș" soup recipes can include various kinds of vegetables and any kind of meat, including fish. "Borș/ciorbă de perișoare" (a broth with meatballs) is quite common. One ingredient required in all recipes by Romanian tradition is lovage leaves, which has a characteristic flavour and significantly improves the soup's aroma.

See also
 Borș de burechiușe
 Kvass
 Tarhana
 Rejuvelac
 Sour rye soup

Notes and references

Romanian soups
Moldovan cuisine
Romanian sauces
Fermented foods